Black Magic is the third studio album by Nigerian singer Yemi Alade, released by Effyzzie Music Group on December 15, 2017. A follow-up to her 2017 EP Mama Afrique, the album features guest appearances from Falz and Olamide. Black Magic was made available for pre-order in November 2017. Prior to disclosing the album's title, Alade posted the acronym BM on social media and wanted her fans to guess its meaning. The album was produced by DJ Coublon, Vtek, Sarz, Krizbeatz, Young D, Sess, Fliptyce, IAmBeat, Philkeyz, 2Kriss and Echo. It was supported by the previously released singles "Knack Am", "Single & Searching" and "Heart Robber". The album received generally negative reviews from music critics, who panned its lyrics and Alade's songwriting.

Composition
"Knack Am" is composed of melodious strings and exotic instruments. The R&B track "Yaba Left" is named after the street lingo for Yaba's Federal Neuro Psychiatric Hospital. "Mr Stamina" is a South African house record that explores a bit of Alade's sexual desires. The Sess-produced track "Wonder Woman" mixes trap music with heavy basslines and a shortened TED speech. The dance song "Kpirim" contains elements of Igbo highlife while "Bum Bum" features a percussion-heavy dancehall production.

Singles
The DJ Coublon-produced track "Knack Am" was released on August 18, 2017, as the album's lead single. It contains elements of Igbo highlife and features strings by Fiokee. The Clarence Peters-directed music video for "Knack Am" was released on August 23, 2017. It features lush colours, aesthetics, theatrical expressions and a variety of dance styles. A snippet of the video was teased on Instagram a day before its official release. Fisayo Okare of Native magazine said the song's narrative is incoherent with the part of the video that were choreographed by children between the ages of 4 and 6.

The album's second "Single & Searching" was released on November 3, 2017. The song features a rap verse by Falz, marking his third collaboration with Alade. "Single & Searching" is a reversal of the duo's previous collaborative track "Marry Me". The song portrays Falz as a single man attempting to lure his love interest under the pretext of being single. The Clarence Peters-directed visuals for "Single & Searching" features a cameo appearance from Nigerian comedian Gloria Oloruntobi. The video sheds light on married men who fail to provide for their wives, and showcases the pain women endure as a result of their husband's betrayal.

The love track "Heart Robber" was also released on November 3, 2017, as the album's third single. Musically, it is an Afrobeats song that contains a mid-tempo guitar riff and elements of Mariachi. The visuals for the song was shot and directed by Clarence Peters. The album's fourth single "Bum Bum" was released on March 13, 2018. The accompanying visuals for "Bum Bum" features Afro-inspired styling and hip-hop apparel. In the video, Alade is seen embracing dance and showing off her moves with backup dancers. The album's fifth single "Kpirim" was released on May 23, 2018. The accompanying music video for the song was shot and directed by Bukola Jimoh.

Critical reception
Black Magic received generally negative reviews from music critics. A writer for Pulse Nigeria gave the album 2.5 stars out of 5, criticizing Alade's songwriting skills and concluding that she needs to "unlearn her basic inclination to record music in the way that she currently does". Wilfred Okiche of 360nobs considers Black Magic to be Alade's weakest record to date and said it "lacks the experimentation and ambitious drive of Mama Africa, as well as the hit making pose of King of Queens". A writer for the website Music in Africa criticized Alade for "covering geographical ground without giving the music and lyrics as much consideration".

Track listing

Personnel
Credits adapted from the album's back cover.

Yemi Alade – primary artist, writing
Koribo Harrison – executive producer
Taiye Aliyu – executive producer
Henry Enebeli – writing 
Olamide Adedeji – featured artist, writing 
Geniuzz – writing 
Klem – writing 
Young D – production 
Sarz – production 
Philkeyz – production 
IAmBeat – production 
Vtek – production, mastering 
Fliptyce – production 
Sess – production 
Krizbeatz – production 
2Kriss – production 
Echo – production 
DJ Coublon – production 
Fiokee – guitar 
Guitar Prince – guitar 
Olaitan Dada – mixing 
Swaps – mixing, mastering

Release history

References 

2017 albums
Yemi Alade albums
Igbo-language albums
Albums produced by DJ Coublon
Albums produced by Sarz
Albums produced by Krizbeatz